The Asian rosy finch or Asian rosy-finch (Leucosticte arctoa) is a species of finch in the family Fringillidae.
It breeds in Mongolia and the East Palearctic; it winters in Manchuria, Korea, Sakhalin and Japan.
Its natural habitats are tundra and temperate grassland.

Taxonomy
This species has been genetically included in a group of Arid-Zone Carduelini finches, which comprises the following species: Carpodacus nipalensis,
Rhodopechys githaginea, Rhodopechys mongolica.

Subspecies
Leucosticte arctoa arctoa Russian Altai
Leucosticte arctoa brunneonucha Mountains of East Siberia (Lena River to Kamchatka and Kuril Islands)
Leucosticte arctoa cognata Sayan Mountains and adjacent mountains on Russia Mongolia border
Leucosticte arctoa gigliolii Mountains north of Lake Baikal (east to Yablonovy Mts.)

References

Asian rosy finch
Birds of Mongolia
Birds of North Asia
Asian rosy finch
Taxonomy articles created by Polbot